Ittoqqortoormiit Heliport  is a heliport in Ittoqqortoormiit, a village in the Sermersooq municipality in eastern Greenland.

Airlines and destinations 

Because of passenger capacity, the helicopters do up to four flights for each departing airplane. There are 50 minutes between these helicopter departures, causing a longer total travel time for many passengers.

Relocation
The Nerlerit Inaat Airport may be relocated  to a new site on Liverpool Land much closer to Ittoqqortoormiit, between the settlement and Uunarteq (Kap Tobin) to the south, thus eliminating the need for helicopter transfers. The project would be economical if the need for the helicopter could be eliminated, but it is needed for search and rescue also.

References

Airports in the Arctic
Heliports in Greenland